Robert Hibbs may refer to:

 Robert John Hibbs (1943–1966), United States Army officer and  Medal of Honor recipient
 Robert B. Hibbs (1932–2017), suffragan bishop of the Episcopal church